The Dranse is a French river in the department of Haute-Savoie, that empties into Lake Geneva between Thonon-les-Bains and Évian-les-Bains.

The name "Dranse" comes from the former Drantia, based on the hydronym dur-, dora and the suffix -antia.

Geography

 To the east, the Dranse d'Abondance irrigates the Val d'Abondance and passes through the communes of Abondance and Châtel;
 To the south, the Dranse de Morzine passes through Morzine, Saint-Jean-d'Aulps and the Gorges du Pont-du-Diable;
 To the west, the Brevon, also called the Dranse de Bellevaux, originates from Roc d'Enfer and passes through Lac de Vallon and the villages of Bellevaux, Vailly and Reyvroz.

The Dranse d'Abondance is considered the higher-ordered stream of the Dranse. The Dranse de Morzine is consequently considered its tributary, according to Sandre, the French National Service for Water Data and Common Repositories Management.

Whitewater kayakers and commercial rafting companies frequently run this river.

Hydrology

The Dranse is a high-volume river, as are all the rivers which originate in the Alpine mountain ranges. Its discharge was observed for a period of 97 years (1906–2003) in Reyvroz, a locality in the department of Haute-Savoie situated on the southern bank of Lake Geneva at the same elevation as its outlet. The drainage basin for the river is in its totality , which is not quite three times the surface area of the city of Paris.

The Dranse is a typical seasonal river regime, with depends slightly on a small rain component. It exhibits sharply delineated seasonal fluctuations in discharge, which is characteristic of Alpine waterbodies. High flows occur in the springtime and are attributed to snowmelt. At the end of June, discharge rates sharply drop while the volume moves downstream. However, these fluctuations are much more pronounced over short periods and depend on the year.

In terms of floods which, although uncommon, can be very important, measures with certain "eau du midi". The maximum instantaneous discharge for a two-year (P2) and five-year (P5) flood events are  respectively.

For comparison, the June 1963 value is comparable to a vicennial flood event, and is thus considered not that exceptional.

The discharge volume of Dranse is augmented by the abundant precipitation in the northern Alps. The runoff curve number for its drainage basin is  annually, which elevated, is three times greater than the average for all of France.

See also
 List of rivers of France

References

External links 
  Le Delta de la Dranse, on the Natura 2000 website
  Banque Hydro - Station V0334010 - La Dranse à Reyvroz (Bioge) (Synthèse)  (the "Station en service" is unchecked)

Rivers of France
Rivers of Haute-Savoie
Rivers of Auvergne-Rhône-Alpes